Laila Robins is an American stage, film and television actress. She has appeared in films including Planes, Trains and Automobiles (1987), An Innocent Man (1989), Live Nude Girls (1995), True Crime (1999), She's Lost Control (2014), Eye in the Sky (2015), and A Call to Spy (2019). Her television credits include regular roles on Gabriel's Fire, Homeland, and Murder in the First. In 2022, she portrays Pamela Milton in the final season of The Walking Dead.

Life and career
Robins was born in St. Paul, Minnesota, the daughter of Latvian American parents Brigita (née Švarcs) and Jānis, whose surname was originally spelled Robiņš. Her father was a research chemist. Robins has three sisters. She received her undergraduate degree at the University of Wisconsin–Eau Claire and attended the Yale School of Drama, earning a master of fine arts. Robins has been in a relationship with the actor Robert Cuccioli since 2000. They co-starred in Macbeth at the Shakespeare Theatre of New Jersey as Macbeth and Lady Macbeth, among other plays.

Film and television
Robins made her big screen debut starring opposite Steve Martin in the 1987 comedy film Planes, Trains and Automobiles. She then starred opposite Tom Selleck in the 1989 crime thriller An Innocent Man; Welcome Home, Roxy Carmichael (1990); the sex comedy Live Nude Girls (1995) with Dana Delany and Kim Cattrall; and True Crime (1999). On the small screen, Robins co-starred with James Earl Jones in the ABC crime drama series Gabriel's Fire, from 1990 to 1991, and guest-starred on Law & Order, Law & Order: Special Victims Unit, Law & Order: Criminal Intent, Third Watch, Sex and the City, 30 Rock, and The Good Wife. She also played a younger version of Livia Soprano, the mother of mobster Tony Soprano, in the two episodes of HBO crime drama series The Sopranos.

In 2014, Robins starred as Martha Boyd, the U.S. ambassador to Pakistan, in the fourth season of Showtime drama series Homeland. The following year, she was a regular cast member in the TNT drama series Murder in the First, and in 2016–2017, she had a recurring role in Quantico. In 2018 she starred in the short-lived ABC drama series Deception. She had a recurring role as Katarina Rostova in season 7 of the NBC series The Blacklist from 2019 to 2021. She also had recurring roles in In Treatment, Bored to Death, Mr. Mercedes, Dr. Death and The Boys. In 2022, Robins joined the cast of AMC drama series The Walking Dead as Governor of the Commonwealth, Pamela Milton.

Theatre
Robins appeared on Broadway as Lady Utterword in the Roundabout Theatre Company's revival of George Bernard Shaw's Heartbreak House (2006). Robins's other Broadway appearances were Frozen by Bryony Lavery (2004), The Herbal Bed by Peter Whelan (1998), and The Real Thing by Tom Stoppard (1985), directed by Mike Nichols. (Robins succeeded actress Glenn Close in the role).

Robins has appeared off-Broadway in Sore Throats by Howard Brenton, The Merchant of Venice by William Shakespeare, Mrs. Klein by Nicholas Wright (in which she also toured with Uta Hagen) (1995–1996), Burnt Piano by Justin Fleming, opposite Richard Thomas in Second Stage Theatre's Tiny Alice (2000). and The Film Society by Jon Robin Baitz, among others. She has also appeared in numerous regional theatre productions, such as the 1997 Fiftieth Anniversary production of A Streetcar Named Desire at the Steppenwolf Theatre in Chicago. Robins also appeared as Cleopatra in Antony and Cleopatra at the Guthrie Theater in Minneapolis in 2002. Robins is also a frequent performer at the Shakespeare Theatre of New Jersey, where she has starred in Macbeth, Three Sisters and The Cherry Orchard. 

Charles Isherwood, critic for The New York Times, assessed her stage work as Ariadne in George Bernard Shaw's Heartbreak House (2006) opposite Swoosie Kurtz as follows: "...this expert comic actress [Kurtz] may not fit the textbook definition of siren, as Hesione is called, but she may just be the most seductive woman on a New York stage right now...unless that nod goes to Ms. Robins, who locates the essence of her character's shallow allure in a languid, liquid strut and a smile both entrancing and devouring".

Robins has won or been nominated for several awards for her work including the Actors' Equity Foundation Joe A. Callaway Award (1995), for The Merchant of Venice, the 2012 Drama Desk Award, Outstanding Ensemble for Sweet and Sad, the Lucille Lortel Award nominations for Outstanding Featured Actress (2004) for Frozen and Outstanding Lead Actress (2007) for Sore Throats, the 1997 Joseph Jefferson Award Best Actress for A Streetcar Named Desire at The Steppenwolf Theatre, the Helen Hayes Award nomination, 1997 Supporting Performer, Non-Resident Production for Mrs. Klein, and the Drama League Award.

Robins is a guest instructor at HB Studio.

Filmography

Film

Television

Stage 
 The Real Thing (1985)...Annie (Replacement); Plymouth Theatre (Broadway)
 Summer and Smoke (1986)...Alma Winemiller; Williamstown Theatre Festival (Williamstown, MA)
 Bloody Poetry (1987)...Mary Shelley; Manhattan Theatre Club (Off-Broadway)
 The Film Society (1988)...Nan Sinclair; Second Stage Theatre/McGinn-Cazale Theatre (Off-Broadway)
 The Lady from the Sea (1988)...Cast; Baltimore Center Stage (Baltimore, MD)
 Maids of Honor (1990)...Monica Bowlin; WPA Theatre (Off-Broadway)
 The Extra Man (1992)...Laura; Manhattan Theatre Club (Off-Broadway)
 The Women (1993)...Cast; Hartford Stage Company (Hartford, CT)
 The Merchant of Venice (1995)... Portia; Joseph Papp Public Theater/Anspacher Theatre (Off-Broadway)
 Mrs. Klein (1996)...Melitta; National Tour
 Mrs. Klein (1995)... Melitta; Lucille Lortel Theatre (Off-Broadway)
 Skylight (1997)...Kyra Hollis; Mark Taper Forum (Los Angeles, CA)
 A Streetcar Named Desire (1997)...Blanche du Bois; Steppenwolf Theatre Company (Chicago, IL)
 The Herbal Bed (1998)...Susanna Hall; Eugene O'Neill Theatre (Broadway)
 Fool for Love (1999)...May; McCarter Theatre (Princeton, NJ)
 Tiny Alice (2000)...Cast; Second Stage Theatre (Off-Broadway)
 Hedda Gabler (2000)... Hedda Gabler; Guthrie Theater (Minneapolis, MN)
 Burnt Piano (2001) ...Karen; HB Playwrights Theatre (Off-Broadway)
 Three Sisters (2001)...Masha; New Jersey Shakespeare Theatre (Madison, NJ)
 Antony and Cleopatra (2002)...Cleopatra; Guthrie Theater (Minneapolis, MN)
 Resurrection Blues (2002)...Emily; Guthrie Theater (Minneapolis, MN)
 Fiction (2003)...Linda; McCarter Theatre (Princeton, NJ)
 King John (2003)... Constance; New Jersey Shakespeare Theater (Madison, NJ)
 Macbeth (2004)...Lady Macbeth; The Shakespeare Theatre of New Jersey (Madison, NJ)
 Frozen (2004)...Agnetha; Circle in the Square Theatre (Broadway)
 Frozen (2004)... Agnetha; MCC Theater (Off-Broadway)
 Heartbreak House (2006)...Lady Utterwood; American Airlines Theatre (Broadway)
 A Street Car Named Desire (2008) The Shakespeare Theatre of New Jersey (Madison, NJ)
 Noises Off (2009) The Shakespeare Theatre of New Jersey (Madison, NJ)
 The Dance of Death (2013) The Red Bull Theater (New York, NY)
 The Lion in Winter (2016) Guthrie Theatre (Minneapolis, MN)

References

External links
 

List of stage credits and other information
Family Background and Obituary of Laila Robin's father

American film actresses
American musical theatre actresses
American stage actresses
American television actresses
American people of Latvian descent
Living people
Yale School of Drama alumni
Yale University alumni
University of Wisconsin–Eau Claire alumni
Actresses from Saint Paul, Minnesota
20th-century American actresses
21st-century American actresses
Year of birth missing (living people)